Radiarctia sinefascia is a moth in the family Erebidae. It was described by George Hampson in 1916. It is found in Nigeria and Zimbabwe.

References

Moths described in 1916
Spilosomina